Frederick George Bergdinon (June 22, 1906 — March 4, 1995), also known as Fred Bourdginon, was a Canadian ice hockey right winger. He played two games for the Boston Bruins of the National Hockey League (NHL) during the 1925–26 season.

Bourdginon was born in Parry Sound, Ontario. He played junior hockey for Parry Sound in the Ontario Hockey Association (OHA) from 1922 until 1924. He was signed as a free agent by Boston Bruins on December 14, 1925 and made a late appearance the following day, a 2-1 loss to the  played two games for the Bruins that season. His first game came on December 11 against the Pittsburgh Pirates, and the second was on December 15 against the Ottawa Senators.

Bourdginon died in a 1995 car crash, along with his son John.

Career statistics

Regular season and playoffs

References

External links
 

1906 births
1995 deaths
Boston Bruins players
Canadian ice hockey right wingers
Franco-Ontarian people
Ice hockey people from Ontario
Sportspeople from Parry Sound, Ontario